Édouard-Victoire-Antoine Lalo (27 January 182322 April 1892) was a French composer. His most celebrated piece is the Symphonie espagnole, a five-movement concerto for violin and orchestra, which remains a popular work in the standard repertoire.

Biography
Lalo was born in Lille, in the northernmost part of France. He attended that city's conservatoire in his youth. Beginning at age 16, he studied at the Paris Conservatoire under François Antoine Habeneck.  Habeneck conducted student concerts at the Conservatoire from 1806 and became the founding conductor of the Orchestre de la Société des Concerts du Conservatoire in 1828.

For several years, Lalo worked as a string player and teacher in Paris. In 1848, he joined with friends to found the Armingaud Quartet, in which he played the viola and later, second violin. His earliest surviving compositions are songs and chamber works (two early symphonies were destroyed).

In 1865, Lalo married Julie Besnier de Maligny, a contralto from Brittany. She encouraged Lalo's early interest in opera and led him to compose works for the stage, most notably the opera Le Roi d'Ys. These works were never really popular, despite their originality, and incurred criticism for being too progressive and Wagnerian. This led Lalo to dedicate most of his career to the composition of chamber music, which was gradually coming into vogue in France, as well as works for orchestra.

Lalo's distinctive style has earned him a degree of popularity. The Symphonie espagnole for violin and orchestra still enjoys a prominent place in the repertoire of violinists, while the Cello Concerto in D minor is occasionally revived. His Symphony in G minor was a favourite of Sir Thomas Beecham and has occasionally been championed by later conductors. His music is notable for its strong melodies and colourful orchestration, with a Germanic solidity that distinguishes him from other French composers of his era. Such works as the Scherzo in D minor, one of his most colourful pieces, embody his distinctive style and strong expressive bent.

Le Roi d'Ys, an opera based on the Breton legend of Ys, is Lalo's most complex and ambitious creation. (This same legend inspired Claude Debussy's La cathédrale engloutie.) Lalo became a member of the Legion of Honour in 1873. Le Roi d'Ys was not initially considered performable and was not staged until 1888, when Lalo was 65 years old. He died in Paris in 1892, leaving several unfinished works, including his opera La Jacquerie, completed by Arthur Coquard. He was interred at the Père Lachaise Cemetery.

Lalo's son Pierre (6 September 18669 June 1943) was a music critic who wrote for Le Temps and other French periodicals from 1898 until his death.

Compositions

References in modern culture
In 1962, composer Maurice Jarre used a theme from Lalo's Piano Concerto for the exotic score to Lawrence of Arabia.

The American science fiction television series, Star Trek: The Next Generation, makes reference to a "U.S.S. Lalo" in two different episodes, "We'll Always Have Paris" and "The Best of Both Worlds"; the reference may be to the French composer, to the Argentine-American television and film music composer Lalo Schifrin, or to both.

Part of Lalo's Cello Concerto in D minor was used in the second season of Mozart in the Jungle.

References

Macdonald, Hugh (1998), "Lalo, Edouard-Victoire-Antoine", in Stanley Sadie, (Ed.), The New Grove Dictionary of Opera, Vol. Two. London: Macmillan Publishers, Inc.

External links

Lalo Piano Trio Nos. 1-3 sound-bites and discussion of works
 

1823 births
1892 deaths
19th-century classical composers
19th-century French male classical violinists
19th-century French composers
Burials at Père Lachaise Cemetery
Chevaliers of the Légion d'honneur
Conservatoire de Paris alumni
French ballet composers
French classical violists
French male classical composers
French opera composers
French people of Spanish descent
French Romantic composers
Male opera composers
Musicians from Lille
20th-century violists